Ryan Miller (born July 6, 1989) is a former American football offensive guard. He attended the University of Colorado at Boulder. Miller was considered one of the best offensive guards of his class.

High school career
Miller attended Columbine High School in Littleton, Colorado, where he played offensive tackle and defensive end.  He refused a starting position his sophomore year as playing varsity football was an overwhelming challenge. As a senior, he started all 14 games at offensive tackle, averaging well over 10 pancake blocks per game, did not allow a quarterback sacks, was flagged for just one penalty and had five direct touchdown blocks. On defense, he registered 31 tackles, 20 solo with 12 for losses including five sacks, with 10 hurries, four passes broken up, two fumble recoveries with one forced as a reserve. He was named Colorado's Gatorade Player of the Year, he earned a host of All-America honors for his senior season, including Parade, USA Today, SuperPrep, Rivals.com, PrepStar and MaxPreps. Miller was selected to play in the 2007 U. S. Army All-American Bowl in San Antonio, Texas, and he helped the West to a 24-7 win.

Regarded as a five-star recruit by Rivals.com, Miller was listed as the No. 2 offensive tackle prospect in the class of 2007, behind only Josh Oglesby. He picked Colorado over scholarship offers from Miami (Fl.), Nebraska, Notre Dame, Oklahoma, and USC.

College career
In his true freshman year at Colorado, Miller played in 10 games and started seven, including the 2007 Independence Bowl, at right offensive tackle. He became the first tackle to play as a true freshman at Colorado since Bryan Campbell, who played as a reserve behind Mark VanderPoel on the 1989 and 1990 teams, and when he started, that made him just the ninth true freshman to start a game on the offensive line at Colorado since freshmen were allowed to play again in 1972. Miller earned first-team Freshman All-America honors from The Sporting News, second-team by Scout.com, and third-team by College Football News. TSN also selected him first-team Freshman All-Big 12.

After starting the first four games of his sophomore season at right tackle, Miller went down with a broken fibula on the second play of the second half against Florida State in Jacksonville, Florida. He was granted a medical hardship after missing the bulk of the 2008 season due to injury, thus he picked up an extra year of eligibility. Miller returned to the field in 2009, and started all 12 games, seven at right guard where he opened the season, and five at right tackle when the line was shuffled for assorted reasons.  His was a Walter Camp All American his senior year. He was also an Outland Trophy Candidate, given to the best lineman in college football.

Professional career

Cleveland Browns
Miller was drafted 160th overall by the Cleveland Browns in the 2012 draft.

On July 27, 2013, Miller sustained a head injury during blocking drills at the Browns' indoor facility. He was taken by ambulance to the Cleveland Clinic where he was treated. He played in 8 games as a rookie.

References

External links
 
 NFL Combine bio
 Colorado Buffaloes bio
 
 

1989 births
Living people
Sportspeople from Littleton, Colorado
Players of American football from Colorado
American football offensive guards
Colorado Buffaloes football players
Cleveland Browns players
Denver Broncos players
San Diego Chargers players
Dallas Cowboys players